Ruby Phillips, known professionally as Ruby Fields, is an Australian singer-songwriter and guitarist from Cronulla, New South Wales. In 2018, she released her debut EP Your Dad's Opinion for Dinner, followed by the singles "I Want", "P Plates", and "Ritalin". Her single "Dinosaurs" reached number nine on Triple J's Hottest 100 of 2018.

In 2019, she released her second EP Permanent Hermit, which contained the singles "Dinosaurs", "Climate", and "Trouble". Her debut album Been Doin' It for a Bit was released in September 2021 and debuted atop the ARIA Albums Chart.

Early life
Fields' hometown is Cronulla in southern Sydney. She began songwriting when she was 11 and busking when she was 13. Fields spent several years learning how to build guitars and repair music equipment from her friend's father. She grew up listening to bands such as AC/DC, Fleetwood Mac, and Guns N' Roses.

Music career

2016–2018: Early years and Your Dad's Opinion for Dinner
Since 2016, Fields has been performing live with supporting band members; Adam Newling on lead guitar, Tas Wilson on bass guitar, and Patrick Rogers on drums.

In 2017, Fields uploaded her debut single "I Want" to the Triple J Unearthed website, which was played on nationwide radio station Triple J on the same day. The track, along with her follow-up single "P Plates", reached the top 200 in the Triple J Hottest 100, 2017.

Fields performed at The Plot 2017 and South by Southwest 2018. She also supported Ball Park Music and San Cisco on tour in 2018, and performed at St Jerome's Laneway Festival in 2019.

2019: Permanent Hermit
On 27 January 2019, her song "Dinosaurs" reached number 9 in Triple J's Hottest 100 of 2018. In March 2019, Fields released "Climate" and announced the release of her second EP Permanent Hermit, which was released on the 3 May 2019.

For a week in July 2019, Fields took over the triple j Breakfast radio show slot, replacing regular hosts Ben Harvey and Liam Stapleton.

2020-present: Been Doin' It for a Bit and Live from Repentance Creek Hall
In 2020, Fields released "Pretty Grim" and in April 2021, "R.E.G.O.", the second single from her forthcoming debut studio album.

In July 2021, Fields released "Song About a Boy" and announced her debut album is due for release on 24 September 2021. Been Doin' It for a Bit debuted at number 1 on the ARIA Charts. In February 2022, Fields released Live from Repentance Creek Hall featuring live recordings from Been Doin' It for a Bit.

Discography

Studio albums

Extended plays

Notes

Singles

Promotional singles

Awards

APRA Awards
The APRA Awards are held in Australia and New Zealand by the Australasian Performing Right Association to recognise songwriting skills, sales and airplay performance by its members annually. Fields has been nominated for one award.

|-
| 2020
| "Dinosaurs"
| Most Performed Rock Work of the Year
| 
|-

J Awards
The J Awards are an annual series of Australian music awards that were established by the Australian Broadcasting Corporation's youth-focused radio station Triple J. They commenced in 2005.

! 
|-
| J Awards of 2017
| Ruby Fields
| Unearthed Artist of the Year
| 
| 
|-
| J Awards of 2021
| Been Doin' It for a Bit
| Australian Album of the Year
| 
|

National Live Music Awards
The National Live Music Awards (NLMAs) are a broad recognition of Australia's diverse live industry, celebrating the success of the Australian live scene. The awards commenced in 2016.

|-
| National Live Music Awards of 2020
| Ruby Fields
| NSW Act Voice of the Year
| 
|-

Rolling Stone Australia Awards
The Rolling Stone Australia Awards are awarded annually in January or February by the Australian edition of Rolling Stone magazine for outstanding contributions to popular culture in the previous year.

! 
|-
| 2022
| Been Doin' It for a Bit
| Best Record
| 
| 
|-

References

Musicians from Sydney
Australian women guitarists
Australian women singer-songwriters
Living people
21st-century Australian singers
21st-century Australian women singers
1998 births